Aquincum Institute of Technology (AIT) is a study abroad opportunity for North American undergraduates in Budapest, Hungary. AIT offers undergraduate programs in computer science, software engineering, and information technology. Established in 2007, the program was created by the businessman Gábor Bojár, founder of Graphisoft. After Bojár sold Graphisoft, he used a majority of the profit from this sale to found AIT in an effort to "Invest in People.". The first official semester was Spring 2011. Each semester, approximately 30-50 North American students study at AIT.

A similar program for mathematics students in Budapest is the Budapest Semesters in Mathematics Program.

Scientific advisory board
 László Babai
 Albert-László Barabási
 Péter Csermely
 András Falus
 Daniel L. Goroff
 Anthony Knerr
 Norbert Kroó
 László Lovász
 Ernő Rubik
 Charles Simonyi

Notes

References 
"AIT-Budapest: Aquincum Institute of Technology," http://www.ait-budapest.com/.

Universities in Budapest